A zitiron, or sea knight, is a mythological creature that has an upper body in the form of an armed knight, fused with the tail of a fish.

References

Citations

Bibliography

Mythological human hybrids
Mermaids